The Pelham Panthers, formerly the Port Colborne Pirates, are a junior ice hockey team based in Pelham, Ontario, Canada. They play in the Golden Horseshoe division of the Greater Ontario Junior Hockey League.

History
The Port Colborne Recreationists were a junior ice hockey team in the Ontario Hockey Association that played at the Junior B level through most of the 1940s.  The Recreationists captured the 1943 Junior B championship, Sutherland Cup and were promoted to the Junior A level the following year where they competed for one full season.  The Junior A team folded early in their second season and the Recreationists returned to Junior B hockey the following year.

The "Sailors" moniker dates back to the 1940s as well.  The Port Colborne Sailors were one of the most successful franchises in the OHA Major Intermediate A Hockey League winning championships in 1949, 1950, 1961, 1962, 1965, 1969, 1970, 1975 and 1976.

Since 1970 the Sailors have spent most of their time in the Niagara Junior C Hockey League with the exception of 1975 through 1979 when the team participated in the Niagara District Junior B Hockey League.  The team changed its name several times (Sailors, Swords, Kinsmen, Schooners) before returning to the familiar "Sailors" moniker that the team played as between 1995 and 2008.  In 2009 the team rebranded itself one more time as the Port Colborne Pirates.

Sutherland Cups: 1943 (as the Port Colborne Recreationists)

In 2014, after decades in Port Colborne, the team relocated to Pelham.  In November 2014, the team changed their nickname to the Panthers.

Season-by-season results

See also
Port Colborne Recreationists

References

External links
Panthers Webpage
GOJHL Webpage

Golden Horseshoe Junior B Hockey League teams
Port Colborne